The Saratoga Springs City School District is the public school district of Saratoga Springs, New York. The district is an independent public entity. It is governed by the  Saratoga Springs City School District Board of Education, whose members are elected in non-partisan elections for staggered, three-year terms. The board selects a superintendent, who is the district's chief administrative official. The district's offices are located in the former Junior High building on 3 Blue Streak Boulevard, next to the high school.

The district has six elementary schools, one middle school, and one comprehensive high school serving about 6,400 students. As of 2015, it spends an average of $16,161 per pupil and has a student to teacher ratio of 14.3 (the national averages are $12,435 and 15.3 respectively).

The district serves students from the city of Saratoga Springs and the Saratoga County towns of Milton, Wilton, Malta, Greenfield and Saratoga.

Schools

High schools
 Saratoga Springs High School - comprehensive high school (9th-12th Grade)

Middle schools
 Maple Avenue Middle School (6th-8th Grade)

Elementary schools
 Caroline Street Elementary School (Pre K- Grade 5)
 Division Street Elementary School (Pre K- Grade 5)
 Dorothy Nolan Elementary School (Pre K- Grade 5)
 Geyser Road Elementary School (Pre K- Grade 5)
 Greenfield Elementary School (Pre K- Grade 5)
 Lake Avenue Elementary School (former location of Saratoga Springs High School) (Pre K- Grade 5)

Board of Education
There are nine (9) Board members. They are elected in the school budget elections in May to staggered three-year terms, which expire on June 30.

 JoAnne Kiernan (President, elected in 2012, re-elected 2015, term expires in 2018)
 Dr. Heather Reynolds (Vice President, elected in 2016, term expires in 2019)
 Steve Grandin (elected in 2009, re-elected 2012 and 2015, term expires in 2018)
 Dr. Stephen C. Verral (elected in 2014, re-elected in 2017, term expires in 2020)
 John Ellis (elected in 2015, term expires in 2018)
 Brad Thomas (elected in 2016, term expires in 2019)
 Jim Wendell (elected in 2016, term expires in 2019)
 Anjeanette Emeka (elected in 2017, term expires in 2020)
 Jennifer Leidig (elected in 2017, term expires in 2020)

Source: http://www.saratogaschools.org/board_members.cfm?master=304262&cfm=end&school=0

69

External links
 

Education in Saratoga County, New York
Saratoga Springs, New York
School districts in New York (state)
1923 establishments in New York (state)
School districts established in 1923